The Șcheiu or Cheu is a small river in the city of Brașov, Romania. It is intercepted by the Canalul Timiș (Timiș Canal). The upper reach of the river, upstream of Brașov, is also known as the Oabăn. The lower reach of the river was channelized so as to flow along the walls of the medieval city, contributing to the defenses of the city; this reach is also known as the Graft. It flows through the historic city district Șcheii Brașovului.

References

Rivers of Romania
Rivers of Brașov County